Acacia nitidula is a shrub of the genus Acacia and the subgenus Plurinerves that is endemic to an area along the south coast of south western Australia.

Description
Like most species of Acacia it has phyllodes rather than true leaves. It produces yellow flowers.

Taxonomy
The species was first formally described by the botanist George Bentham in 1864 as a part of the work Flora Australiensis. It was reclassified by Leslie Pedley in 2003 as Racosperma nitidulum then transferred back to genus Acacia in 2006.

Distribution
It is native to an area in the Wheatbelt, Great Southern and Goldfields-Esperance regions of Western Australia where it is commonly situated among granite boulders growing in gravelly, sandy granitic soils. The range of the plant extends from Jerramungup and Ravensthorpe in the west to Cape Arid National Park including Middle Island.

See also
 List of Acacia species

References

nitidula
Acacias of Western Australia
Taxa named by George Bentham
Plants described in 1864